Juan Manuel Muñoz (born 11 January 1985) is a Spanish–Swiss football player. He currently plays for FC Grünstern.

He played six games in Swiss Super League before followed Neuchâtel Xamax relegated in summer 2006.

While Neuchâtel Xamax came back to top division in summer 2007, he stayed in Swiss Challenge League with his new club Chiasso.

References

External links
 Profile at weltfussball.de

1985 births
Living people
Spanish footballers
Swiss Super League players
Swiss Challenge League players
FC Chiasso players
FC Solothurn players
SV Muttenz players
Neuchâtel Xamax FCS players
Association football defenders
FC Stade Nyonnais players
Place of birth missing (living people)
Swiss people of Spanish descent